Avetik Isahakyan Central Library, officially Yerevan Municipality “City Central Library after Avetik Isahakyan” communal non-commercial organization is a public library in Yerevan, Armenia. It was founded in 1935 at 26 Amiryan Street, with T. Barkhudaryan as its headmaster. In 1955, it was renamed after the famous poet Avetik Isahakyan on the 80th anniversary of the master. Today the library's main building is located at 4/1 Nalbandyan street, with 10 branches located on  Baghramyan, Sayat-Nova avenue, Tigran Mets, Komitas and Kievyan avenues and Moskovyan, N. Zaryan, Atoyan, Rustaveli, Norq 5th and Mamikonyants streets. Readers can use free wi-fi service, online library, electronic book databases. Readers are able to purchase modern Kindle E-readers to read books in electronic format. Isahakyan library is also a place for meetings and a cultural corner for literary discussions and various cultural events focusing on the themes preservation of the nation and its traditions, the importance of the books and writing. The library serves up to 1500 visitors daily.

See also
National Library of Armenia
Khnko Aper Children's Library

References

Buildings and structures in Yerevan
Libraries established in 1935
Armenian culture
Libraries in Armenia